UNX LLC is an independent trading technology firm and a registered agency broker (member of FINRA/SIPC) that provides electronic trading to a diverse client base which includes traditional asset managers, pension funds, hedge funds and sell side execution desks. UNX has offices in Burbank, California and New York, New York.

History
UNX was founded in 1998 by Oscar Olmedo, Poul Moller and Randy Abernethy to provide direct market access trading systems to institutional clients. In 2000, the company launched Basket Trading Center, a web based single stock and portfolio trading platform that provided clients access to North American execution venues. That year, UNX also launched its smart routing and tactical order routing engine. In 2002, UNX acquired Embarcadero Securities and launched the Metabook Execution Management System. In 2009, UNX introduced the broker-neutral Catalyst platform and began the process of integrating trading algorithms of major broker-dealers into the UNX Marketplace. 
 
Throughout 2010, UNX integrated equity algorithms and electronic trading services from Credit Suisse, Girard Securities, Goldman Sachs Electronic Trading, Mizuho Securities, Rosenblatt Securities and UBS Investment Bank into its trading connectivity network available through the Catalyst Portal. In 2010, UNX further expanded its broker network to include international equities trading and enhanced its connectivity network by adding algorithms and electronic trading services of JMP Securities and Sterne, Agee and Leach to its Broker Marketplace. In 2011, UNX collaborated with Titan Trading Analytics to provide behavioural research and trading strategies through the Catalyst Portal.

Technology

UNX built the Catalyst Portal using the Microsoft .NET Framework 3.5. Based on the Windows Presentation Foundation, Catalyst uses the Managed Add-In Framework to run all functionality as loadable add-ins, and it supports scripts in languages such as Ruby and Python through the use of the Dynamic Language Runtime.

References

Brokerage firms
Financial services companies of the United States
Electronic trading systems